Porroglossum (from Greek "far off" and "tongue", referring to the position of the lip) is a genus of orchids native to the Andes of South America. The center of diversity lies in Ecuador, with many of the species endemic to that country, though others are found in Colombia, Venezuela, Peru, and Bolivia. This genus is abbreviated Prgm in horticultural trade.

The lip in this genus is unique in the family. It is hinged and has a mechanism that snaps shut when stimulated by a pollinator, thus trapping the insect to ensure that the pollinia will be removed and later transferred to the receptive surface. The lip opens after 30 minutes or so to release the insect, but also closes at night and reopens at dawn.

Species
Species accepted as of June 2014:

Porroglossum actrix Luer & R.Escobar
Porroglossum adrianae Luer & Sijm
Porroglossum agile Luer
Porroglossum amethystinum (Rchb.f.) Garay
Porroglossum andreettae Luer
Porroglossum apoloae Luer & Sijm
Porroglossum aureum Luer
Porroglossum condylosepalum H.R.Sweet
Porroglossum dactylum Luer
Porroglossum dalstroemii Luer
Porroglossum dejonghei Luer & Sijm
Porroglossum dreisei Luer & Andreetta
Porroglossum echidna (Rchb.f.) Garay
Porroglossum ecuagenerense Luer & Hirtz
Porroglossum eduardi (Rchb.f.) H.R.Sweet
Porroglossum gerritsenianum Luer & R.Parsons
Porroglossum hirtzii Luer
Porroglossum hoeijeri Luer
Porroglossum hystrix Luer
Porroglossum jesupiae Luer
Porroglossum josei Luer
Porroglossum lorenae Luer
Porroglossum lycinum Luer
Porroglossum marniae Luer
Porroglossum meridionale P.Ortiz
Porroglossum merinoi Pupulin & A.Doucette
Porroglossum miguelangelii G.Merino, A.Doucette & Pupulin
Porroglossum mordax (Rchb.f.) H.R.Sweet
Porroglossum muscosum (Rchb.f.) Schltr.
Porroglossum myosurotum Luer & Hirtz
Porroglossum nutibara Luer & R.Escobar
Porroglossum olivaceum H.R.Sweet
Porroglossum oversteegenianum Luer & Sijm
Porroglossum parsonsii Luer
Porroglossum peruvianum H.R.Sweet
Porroglossum porphyreum G.Merino, A.Doucette & Pupulin
Porroglossum portillae Luer & Andreetta
Porroglossum procul Luer & R.Vásquez
Porroglossum rodrigoi H.R.Sweet
Porroglossum schramii Luer
Porroglossum sergii P.Ortiz
Porroglossum sijmii Luer
Porroglossum taylorianum Luer
Porroglossum teaguei Luer
Porroglossum teretilabia Luer & Teague
Porroglossum tokachii Luer
Porroglossum tripollex Luer
Porroglossum uxorium Luer

References

External links 

Pleurothallidinae genera
Pleurothallidinae
Orchids of South America